Inger Johanne Nossum (21 May 1930 – 29 August 2009) was a Norwegian academic.

She was born in Stjørdal, and took her first higher education at Levanger Teacher's College. She graduated in 1951, and later took further education. In 1978 she took the cand.ped. degree. In 1963 she was hired at the Norwegian State College for Domestic Science Teachers, eventually being promoted to associate professor. The State College for Domestic Science Teachers became a part of Akershus University College through a 1994 merger, and Nossum served as the first rector from 1994 to 1997. She was a co-founder of the Norwegian branch of the International Federation for Home Economics.

Nossum lived at Bekkestua. In 2005 she became leader of the organization Høyskoletomtens venner, which worked to preserve the State College for Domestic Science Teachers property. She died in August 2009 after short-term illness.

References

1930 births
2009 deaths
Academic staff of Akershus University College
Rectors of universities and colleges in Norway
Women heads of universities and colleges
People from Stjørdal
Nord-Trøndelag University College alumni